Bengal Punch was a sports drink created in 1958 for the Louisiana State University football team. It is believed to be the first sports drink ever created, pre-dating Gatorade by seven years. It was created by Dr. Martin J. Broussard, the long-time LSU athletic trainer who served the university from the mid-1940s until the early 1990s.

Bengal Punch later became a flavor of Quickick sports drinks. The brand was popular throughout the Southeastern US with its main base as Louisiana and Texas. Quickick was formerly owned by Bud Adams, co-founder of the American Football League and former owner of the Houston Oilers, Tennessee Oilers and Tennessee Titans. The ownership of Quickick later resided with a group of businessmen based in Baton Rouge, Louisiana operating as QK Brands. Until 2000, Quickick was bottled and distributed by various Coca-Cola, Dr. Pepper and several other bottlers. After 2000, Quickick brought bottling and distribution in-house and all operations and facilities were located in Baton Rouge, Louisiana.

See also
LSU Tigers and Lady Tigers
LSU Tigers football
LSU Sports

References 

Dietary supplements
LSU Tigers football
LSU Tigers and Lady Tigers
Sports drinks
Products introduced in 1958